The Royal Family Order of the Crown of Brunei is an order of Brunei. It was established on 15 August 1982 by Sultan Hassanal Bolkiah. The order carries the post-nominal letters "DKMB".

Recipients

Bruneian royalty

Current recipients 
Sultan Haji Hassanal Bolkiah, Sultan and Yang di-Pertuan of Brunei (15 August 1982)
Raja Isteri Pengiran Anak Hajah Saleha, Queen Consort of Brunei (15 August 1982)
Pengiran Muda Mahkota Pengiran Muda Haji Al-Muhtadee Billah, Crown Prince of Brunei (15 August 1982)
Pengiran Anak Puteri Hajah Rashidah Sa'adatul Bolkiah, Princess of Brunei
Pengiran Anak Puteri Hajah Muta-Wakkilah Hayatul Bolkiah, Princess of Brunei
Pengiran Anak Puteri Hajah Majeedah Bolkiah, Princess of Brunei
Pengiran Anak Puteri Hajah Hafizah Sururul Bolkiah, Princess of Brunei
Pengiran Muda Abdul Malik, Prince of Brunei
Pengiran Anak Puteri Azemah Ni'matul Bolkiah, Princess of Brunei
Pengiran Anak Puteri Fadzillah Lubabul Bolkiah, Princess of Brunei
Pengiran Muda Abdul Mateen
Pengiran Muda Abdul Wakeel, Prince of Brunei	
Pengiran Anak Puteri Ameerah Wardatul Bolkiah, Princess of Brunei
Pengiran Muda Haji Mohamed Bolkiah, Prince of Brunei
Pengiran Muda Haji Sufri Bolkiah, Prince of Brunei
Pengiran Muda Haji Jefri Bolkiah, Prince of Brunei

Former recipients
Sultan Sir Muda Haji Omar Ali Saifuddien III, former Sultan of Brunei (deceased) 
Pengiran Muda Haji Abdul Azim, Prince of Brunei (deceased)
Hajah Mariam, former consort of Sultan Hassanal Bolkiah (revoked)
Azrinaz Mazhar, former consort of Sultan Hassanal Bolkiah (revoked)

Foreign recipients
: King Hussein I bin Talal I, King of the Hashemite Kingdom of Jordan (1984)
: Sultan Qaboos bin Said, Sultan of Oman (1984)
: Sultan Ismail Petra, Sultan of Kelantan (1988)
: President Soeharto, President of Indonesia (1988)
: King Bhumibol Adulyadej, King of Thailand (1990)
: Queen Elizabeth II, Queen of the United Kingdom and the other Commonwealth Realms (1992)
: Tuanku Ja'afar, Yang di-Pertuan Besar of Negeri Sembilan & 10th Yang di-Pertuan Agong of Malaysia (1996)
: Sultan Mizan Zainal Abidin, Sultan of Terengganu & 13th Yang di-Pertuan Agong of Malaysia (1999)
: Tuanku Syed Sirajuddin, Raja of Perlis & 12th Yang di-Pertuan Agong of Malaysia (2002)
: Sultan Abdul Halim, Sultan of Kedah & 5th and 14th Yang di-Pertuan Agong of Malaysia (2002)
: King Carl XVI Gustaf, King of Sweden (2004)
: King Abdullah II bin Hussein I, King of the Hashemite Kingdom of Jordan (2008)
: Princess Beatrix of the Netherlands, former Queen of the Netherlands (2013) (conferred as Queen)
: Sultan Ibrahim Ismail, Sultan of Johor (2014)
: King Salman, King of Saudi Arabia (2017)
: King Hamad bin Isa Al Khalifa, King of Bahrain (2017)
: Al-Sultan Abdullah, Yang di-Pertuan Agong of Malaysia & Sultan of Pahang (2019)

Unknown date of conferment
: Sultan Ahmad Shah, Sultan of Pahang & 7th Yang di-Pertuan Agong of Malaysia
: Sultan Mahmud, Sultan of Terengganu
: Sultan Azlan Shah, Sultan of Perak & 9th Yang di-Pertuan Agong of Malaysia
: Sultan Salahuddin, Sultan of Selangor & 11th Yang di-Pertuan Agong of Malaysia

References 

Orders, decorations, and medals of Brunei
Awards established in 1982
1982 establishments in Brunei